Criminal: France is a 2019 French-language police procedural anthology series created by George Kay and Jim Field Smith and starring Nathalie Baye, Jérémie Renier and Sara Giraudeau. Criminal: France is part of Netflix's Criminal, an anthology series consisting of twelve episodes, with three episodes set in each of four countries, filmed in local languages – France, Spain, Germany and the UK.

It was released on 20 September 2019 on Netflix.

Premise
Set within the confines of a police interrogation room, French investigators engage in intense games of psychological cat-and-mouse with their accused suspects to find the answers they need in order to solve their cases.

Cast

Accused
 Sara Giraudeau -  Émilie Weber
 Nathalie Baye -  Caroline Solal
 Jérémie Renier -  Jérôme Lacombe

Police
  - Commander Audrey Larsen
  - Commander Gérard Sarkissian
 Laurent Lucas - Captain Olivier Hagen
 Mhamed Arezki - Brigadier Omar Matif
  - Brigadier Laetitia Serra

Episodes

Production
All the episodes were filmed at Netflix's production hub at Ciudad de la Tele in Madrid.

Release
Criminal: France was released on 20 September 2019 on Netflix.

References

External links
 
 

French-language Netflix original programming
Television shows set in France
Television shows filmed in Spain
2010s drama television series
2019 French television series debuts